Akinbode Oluwafemi is a Nigerian environmental activist, Social justice campaigner and tobacco control advocate. He was the Deputy Director of Environmental Rights Action/Friends of the Earth Nigeria (ERA/FoEN). He is a  recipients of the 2009 Bloomberg Awards for Global Tobacco Control. The award ceremony was held at the 14th World Conference on Tobacco or Health held in Mumbai, India. He is the Executive Director at Corporate Accountability and Public Participation Africa (CAPPA) CAPPA, where he has over two decades experience in grassroot organising, policy advocacy and building strong coalitions.

References

Living people
Anti-smoking activists
Nigerian environmentalists
Year of birth missing (living people)
Place of birth missing (living people)
Nigerian health activists